Santa Rosa de Tabalí Airport is an airport serving Santa Rosa de Tabalí, a hacienda winery in the Coquimbo Region of Chile.

The west end of the runway has a  paved overrun that leads to a helipad and parking apron. The local terrain is flat with ravines.

See also

Transport in Chile
List of airports in Chile

References

External links
OpenStreetMap - Tabalí
OurAirports - Santa Rosa de Tabalí

Airports in Chile
Airports in Coquimbo Region